A formal Irish name consists of a given name and a surname. In the Irish language, surnames are generally patronymic in etymology but are no longer literal patronyms as, for example, most Icelandic names still are. The form of a surname varies according to whether its bearer is male or female, and in the case of a married woman, whether she chooses to adopt her husband's surname.

An alternative traditional naming convention consists of the first name followed by a double patronym, usually with the father and grandfather's names. This convention is not used for official purposes but is generalized in Gaeltachtaí (Irish-speaking areas) and also survives in some rural non-Gaeltacht areas. Sometimes the name of the mother or grandmother may be used instead of the father or grandfather.

Epithets
A first name may be modified by an adjective to distinguish its bearer from other people with the same name. Mór ("big") and Óg ("young") are used to distinguish father and son, like English "senior" and "junior", but are placed between the given name and the surname: Seán Óg Ó Súilleabháin corresponds to "John O'Sullivan Jr." (although anglicised versions of the name often drop the "O from the name).

The word Beag/Beg, meaning "little", can be used in place of Óg. This did not necessarily indicate that the younger person was small in stature, merely younger than his father. Sometimes beag would be used to imply a baby was small at birth, possibly premature.

Adjectives denoting hair colour may also be used, especially informally: Pádraig Rua ("red-haired Patrick"), Máire Bhán ("fair-haired Mary").

Surnames and prefixes
A male's surname generally takes the form Ó/Ua (meaning "grandson/descendant of") or Mac ("son/descendant of") followed by the genitive case of a name, as in Ó Dónaill ("grandson/descendant of Dónall") or Mac Siúrtáin ("son/descendant  of Jordan").

A son has the same surname as his father. A female's surname replaces Ó with Ní (reduced from Iníon Uí – "daughter of descendant of") and Mac with Nic (reduced from Iníon Mhic – "daughter of the son of"); in both cases the following name undergoes lenition. However, if the second part of the surname begins with the letter C or G, it is not lenited after Nic. Thus the daughter of a man named Ó Dónaill has the surname Ní Dhónaill; the daughter of a man named Mac Siúrtáin has the surname Nic Siúrtáin. When anglicised, the name can remain O' or Mac, regardless of gender.

If a woman marries, she may choose to take her husband's surname. In this case, Ó is replaced by Bean Uí ("wife of descendant of") and Mac is replaced by Bean Mhic ("wife of the son of"). In both cases bean may be omitted, in which case the woman uses simply Uí or Mhic. Again, the second part of the surname is lenited (unless it begins with C or G, in which case it is only lenited after Uí). Thus a woman marrying a man named Ó Dónaill may choose to use Bean Uí Dhónaill (Mrs. O'Donnell in English) or Uí Dhónaill as her surname; a woman marrying a man named Mac Siúrtáin may choose to use Bean Mhic Siúrtáin (Mrs. MacJordan in English) or Mhic Siúrtáin as her surname.

If the second part of the surname begins with a vowel, the form Ó attaches an h to it, as in Ó hUiginn (O'Higgins) or Ó hAodha (Hughes). The other forms effect no change: Ní Uiginn, (Bean) Uí Uiginn; Mac Aodha, Nic Aodha, Mhic Aodha, and so forth.

Mag is often used instead of Mac before a vowel or (sometimes) the silent fh. The single female form of "Mag" is "Nig". Ua is an alternative form of Ó.

Some names of Norman origin have the prefix Fitz, from Latin language filius "son", such as Fitzwilliam, Fitzgerald, and so forth. Other Norman surnames may have the prefix "de", such as de Búrca, de Paor, or de Róiste.

Patronyms and other additives
Many Irish surnames are concentrated in particular parts of the country and there are areas where a single surname may account for a large proportion of the population. Examples include O'Reilly in County Cavan, Ryan in County Tipperary and East County Limerick, or O'Sullivan in the Beara peninsula of West Cork; or areas, such as Glenullin in the Sperrins, where there are several dominant surnames (in that instance O'Kane, Mullan, McNicholl and some others). In such cases, the surname may also acquire an additive in popular usage to differentiate one group bearing the same surname from another. This sometimes originates as a simple patronym – that is, a James whose father was Harry might be referred to as Harry's James – but may be passed to later generations, so that James' son Pat might be Harry's Pat. This can also occur if a person becomes well known by a nickname: his children may take his nickname as an additive. For example, if Seán O'Brien was often referred to as "Badger", his son Patrick might be referred to orally as Pat Badger and written as Patrick O'Brien (B).

In Tipperary, additives are particularly common among those bearing the Ryan surname. Examples include Ryan Lacken, Ryan Luke and Ryan Doc. A man christened Thomas Ryan might be known as Tommy Doc and his family might be referred to as the Docs. While the additive is not part of a person's official name, it may be used in a postal address, on an election register or in newspaper reports. In this case, Tommy Doc might be written as Thomas Ryan (D).

Traditional Gaeltacht names
In Gaeltachtai (Irish-speaking areas) it remains customary to use a name composed of the first name, followed by the father's name in the genitive case, followed by the name of the paternal grandfather, also in the genitive. Thus Seán Ó Cathasaigh (Seán O'Casey), son of Pól, son of Séamus, would be known to his neighbours as Seán Phóil Shéamuis. Occasionally, if the mother or grandmother was a well-known person locally, her name may be used instead of that of the father or grandfather. If the mother's name is used, then that of the maternal grandfather (or potentially grandmother) follows it, for example, Máire Sally Eoghain.

These names are not used for official purposes. Often a nickname or English version of a name is used in their composition whereas the person would use a standard Irish form in formal circumstances. For example, the prominent sean-nós singer Seán Mac Donnchada is perhaps better known as Johnny Mhairtín Learaí.

This naming system also survives to a certain extent in rural areas outside the existing Gaeltacht. The system can be particularly useful for distinguishing individuals who live in the same locale and who share a common surname but are not closely related. For example, two individuals named John McEldowney might be known as "John Patsy Den" and "John Mary Philip" respectively. Even the Irish forms sometimes survive in parts of the Sperrins, so that among the principal families of Glenullin some branches are known by father/grandfather forms such as Pháidí Shéamais or Bhrian Dhónaill.

Examples of first names and surnames

Notable examples of first names and surnames

Some Irish people use English (or anglicised) forms of their names in English-language contexts and Irish forms in Irish-language contexts.  The Irish names of some famous people include:

Other people are better known by their Irish name than by their English name:

See also
List of Irish-language given names
Celtic onomastics
Place names in Ireland
Scottish Gaelic name
Welsh surnames

References

External links
Irish Names at LibraryIreland.com
The Origins of Irish Surnames at IrishTimes.com
Find Irish Family Names at Dubliner.com
16th & 17th Century Anglicized Irish Surnames from Woulfe  by MedievalScotland.org

Name
Names by culture